The 1998 Golden Globes (Portugal) were the third edition of the Golden Globes (Portugal).

Winners

Cinema:
Best Film: Tentação, with Joaquim Leitão
Best Director: Joaquim Leitão, in Tentação
Best Actress: Ana Zanatti, in Porto Santo
Best Actor: Joaquim de Almeida, in Tentação
nominated: Ruy de Carvalho, in Inês de Portugal

Sports:
Personality of the Year: Carla Sacramento

Fashion:
Personality of the Year: José António Tenente and Maria Gambina

Theatre:
Personality of the Year: João Mota

Music:
Best Individual Performer: Paulo Gonzo
Best Group: Madredeus
Best Song: Jardins Proibidos- Paulo Gonzo

Television:
Best Information Host: José Alberto Carvalho
Best Entertainment Host: Herman José
Best Fiction and Comedy Show: Herman Enciclopédia
Best Entertainment Show: Chuva de Estrelas
Best Information Program: Jornal da Noite

Career Award:
Ruy de Carvalho

References

1997 film awards
1997 music awards
1997 television awards
Golden Globes (Portugal)
1998 in Portugal